The 1999 Bob Jane T-Marts V8 300 was a one-off touring car endurance race run by the Australian Racing Driver's Club at the Mount Panorama Circuit. It was held on 3 October 1999.

The race was held for a combination of the then new Future Touring Car class and by the former Superspeedway category called AUSCAR. Originally these two classes of cars were to take part in the race that became the 1999 Bob Jane T-Marts 500.

Class structure
The race was held for a grid of Holden Commodores and Ford Falcons complying to one of two categories.

Class A was for AUSCAR stock cars, the Australised lower cost and lower specification interpretation of NASCAR.

Class B was for Bathurst Tourers, known previously as New Millennium AUSCARs and later known as Future Touring Cars. The category was invented to provide a road racing category for the AUSCAR stock cars, which were in decline in their home environment at the Calder Park Thunderdome, to be converted relatively inexpensively into circuit racing touring cars.

Official results
Results as follows:

Statistics
 Pole Position - #44 Peter Fitzgerald - 2:28.0188
 Fastest Lap - #44 Peter Fitzgerald - 2:55.1241
 Average Speed - 105 km/h

References

External links
 Official race results

Motorsport in Bathurst, New South Wales
Bob Jane T-Marts V8 300